A catwalk is the runway at a fashion show on which models walk.

Catwalk or The Catwalk may also refer to:

Walkways
 Catwalk (theater), a strip walked on for behind-the-scenes technical functions
 Footbridge#Catwalk, a walkway on a bridge which is used for maintenance access
 Skyway, enclosed or open pedestrian bridge over a street, rail line, or body of water
 Alleyway#Catwalk, an alleyway (usually smaller) that hosts a variety of activities typically associated with petty crime and prostitution. Mainly used in certain parts of Ontario, Canada.

Film and television

Film
 The Catwalk (film), a 1927 German film
 Catwalk (film), a 1995 American film starring Christy Turlington

Television
 Catwalk (Australian TV series), a 1972 Australian TV series
 Catwalk (Canadian TV series), a 1992–1994 Canadian TV series
 "Catwalk" (The Adventures of Batman & Robin), a 1995 episode of the American TV animated series
 "The Catwalk", a 2002 second-season episode of Star Trek: Enterprise

Music
"The Cat Walk", a 1958 song by The Kingsmen, a short-lived band of Franny Beecher and other moonlighting Comets from Bill Haley and the Comets
Catwalk, a 1977 album by Chico Hamilton
"Cat Walk", a 1983 song by Saga from the album Heads or Tales
Catwalk, a 1985 album by Emily Remler
"Catwalk", a 1995 song by Tangerine Dream from Tyranny of Beauty
 "Catwalk", a 2006 song by Japanese hip-hop band Soul'd Out